Posti is a 2022 Indian Punjabi-language film directed by Rana Ranbir and produced by Gippy Grewal. It stars Babbal Rai, Prince Kanwaljit Singh, Surilie Gautam and Raghbir Boli. Initially scheduled to be released on 20 March 2020, the release has been postponed due to the COVID-19 pandemic in India. The film is now scheduled to release on 17 June 2022.

Cast 
 Babbal Rai 
 Prince Kanwaljit Singh as Keeda
 Surilie Gautam
 Raghveer Boli as Soni
 Zareen Khan as Heer Saleti
 Rana Ranbir
 Jass Dhillon
 Malkeet Rauni
 Rana Jung Bahadur
 Tarsem Paul
 Seema Kaushal

Soundtrack 

The soundtrack is composed by Jay K, Desi Routz and Late So New Ramgarhia, lyrics are by Babbal Rai, Maninder Kailey, Pardeep Malik and Ricky Khan. The songs are sung by Jazzy B, Gippy Grewal, Babbal Rai, Rahat Fateh Ali Khan, Prabh Gill and Afsana Khan.

Release 
The film was scheduled to be released on 20 March 2020, but the release was postponed due to COVID-19 pandemic. And after the pandemic the same has released on 17th June 2022 and got praise for its story telling and raising a serious issue in humorously .

References

External links
 

2022 films
Punjabi-language Indian films
Films postponed due to the COVID-19 pandemic